Olimpio Otero Vergés (1845 – 7 September 1911) was a merchant, attorney, composer, musical editor, and a civic leader in Ponce, Puerto Rico.

Early years
Otero Vergés was born in Ponce, Puerto Rico, in 1845. His parents were Antonio Otero Aquilina y Josefa Verges de Perea. He was one of three children in the family. His siblings were Adquilina and Josefa Verges de Clodomiro.

Merchant, composer, and musical editor

Otero founded the first publishing house to publish and distribute Puerto Rican music, called Bazar Otero, on Calle Atocha. His efforts made possible the circulation and distribution of music from the most important composers of his time, such as Manuel Gregorio Tavarez and Juan Morel Campos. The Bazar was also a gathering point for musicians of the area. One of Otero's better known musical compositions is "La Cuñadita".

Civic leader and political activist

As a civic leader, Otero Verges led the Agricultural and Industrial Tobacco Exposition held in Ponce in 1883, just a year after the successful 1882 Exposition Fair that was held in the same city at Plaza Las Delicias in the building now called Parque de Bombas.

In October, 1887, Otero led a three-member commission that organized an expedition to Madrid, Spain, for Julio Vizcarrondo and Juan Bautista Arrillaga Roque to denounce the injustices perpetrated by Spanish governor General Romualdo Palacio González. It resulted in the removal of General Palacio from office. He was a representative (Diputado) to the Spanish Courts.

Otero is also known for his activism for the creation of a road, now PR-123, to link Ponce and Arecibo in the late nineteenth century. In 1903, the Puerto Rico Legislature named a bridge on the Ponce to Adjuntas section of the road in his memory.  The bridge is located in Barrio Magueyes of the municipality of Ponce. A prominent local civic and community leader, Otero was also a member of the organizing board that made possible the 1883 Ponce Fair.

Parque de la Abolicion
In 1880 Otero, together with Juan Mayoral Barnés and Román Baldorioty de Castro, was instrumental in creating the concept for a park in Ponce— known as Parque de la Abolicion—dedicated to the abolition of slavery, the only such memorial in the Caribbean.

Legacy
 In Ponce, there is a school named after him on Calle Villa (Final).
 A bridge between Ponce and Adjuntas is called the Otero Viaduct, in his memory.
 A plaque recognizes him at Ponce's Park of Illustrious Ponce Citizens.

See also

 List of Puerto Ricans

Notes

References

Further reading
 Fay Fowlie de Flores. Ponce, Perla del Sur: Una Bibliográfica Anotada. Second Edition. 1997. Ponce, Puerto Rico: Universidad de Puerto Rico en Ponce. p. 110. Item 564. 
 Eugenio Astol. "El diputado 'Carretera'". Puerto Rico Ilustrado. 16 de mayo de 1936. pp. 13, 66. (Colegio Universitario Tecnológico de Ponce, CUTPO)
 Fay Fowlie de Flores. Ponce, Perla del Sur: Una Bibliográfica Anotada. Second Edition. 1997. Ponce, Puerto Rico: Universidad de Puerto Rico en Ponce. p. 332. Item 1655. 
 Ponce. Oficina del Alcalde. Al pueblo de Ponce y el Hon. Gobernador de Puerto Rico. Tipografía Baldorioty. 1902-1906. (Universidad de Puerto Rico - Rio Piedras.)

External links
Photo of the inside of Bazaar Otero in the 1910s

1845 births
1911 deaths
Burials at Cementerio Civil de Ponce
Puerto Rican composers
Puerto Rican male composers
Businesspeople from Ponce
Attorneys from Ponce
Puerto Rican abolitionists
Musicians from Ponce
19th-century American businesspeople